André Gaillot (4 March 1907 – 24 December 1993) was a French racing cyclist. He rode in the 1933 Tour de France.

References

1907 births
1993 deaths
French male cyclists